The Riverside County Fair and National Date Festival takes place in Indio, California. Since 1947 the annual festival has been held to celebrate the Date Palm harvest in the Coachella Valley. The event is held in February on the Riverside County Fairgrounds.

The agricultural industry is responsible for 95 percent of the nation's crop.

The Date Festival has more than 7000 exhibits and competitions related to the fruit. It has grown to feature musicians and comedians, a Date Festival Queen and her court, monster trucks and bull-riding.

Fair patrollers include security guards, the Indio Police and Riverside County Sheriff's Office.

History
The Fair started as a festival to celebrate the end of the annual date harvest in the desert region, the major commercial date-producing area in the Western Hemisphere. Dates were an unknown commodity in the desert until 1903 when date palms were transplanted there from Algeria. By the early 1920s dates became a major crop for the area. Date groves in the Coachella Valley also became tourist attractions.

With the popularity of the date gardens the idea was planted for the first Date Festival in 1921 to be held in Indio's city park. A second festival was held the following year. Some 16 years later a third Date Festival was held, this time under the name of the Riverside County Fair and the Coachella Valley Date Festival. The Indio Civic Club, under contract from the County Board of Supervisors, sponsored the event.

That year there were 72 booths exhibited and attendance reached 5,000. It was also the first year the street parade was staged. In 1936 Western themes were in style and the Fair took on a Western theme complete with wiskerenos, cowboy hats, and rodeo events.

In 1940 the County purchased the present fairgrounds. The original  cost $10,000 and over the years later the grounds were expanded with the purchase of an additional  including the date grove on the fairgrounds. Presently, the fairgrounds cover .

When World War II started all fairs in California were halted. When the War ended, Robert M.C. Fullenwider was hired to manage the Riverside County Fair and National Date Festival. Fullenwider introduced an "Arabian Nights" theme tying in with the desert region and date industry.

Besides 1923 to 1937 & 1942 to 1945, no fair has happened since 2021 caused by the COVID-19 pandemic. But 2022 had "Thrillville"--a smaller carnival and event.

The Riverside County Board of Supervisors approved in June 2022 a partnership with Pickering Events LLC to bring the Date Festival back to Indio on an annual basis. The agreement brings back the Riverside County Fair & National Date Festival and ensure the continuation of the Fair Board as well as funding support to improve the Fairgrounds facilities, Supervisor Manuel Pérez announced.

Pérez also announced that the next Riverside County Fair & National Date Festival will be held February 17-26, 2023, and it will return as a full-scale event.

“This is great for the City of Indio, the Coachella Valley and Riverside County and for the future of the National Date Festival,” said Supervisor Pérez. “Riverside County and the Fair Board look forward to being partners with Pickering in bringing the Riverside County Fair & National Date Festival back for the community, as well as attracting events to increase use of the Fairgrounds for the community and families.”

Pageant

Also, tying into this theme, the Fair has a scholarship pageant called "Queen Scheherazade".  Students from Riverside County compete to win the scholarship money for continued education and act as the "good will" ambassador over the Fair.

See also

 Shields Date Gardens

References

External links
 Date Festival official website
 
 https://sites.google.com/pickering.events/home/

Indio, California
Coachella Valley
Annual fairs
Annual events in Riverside County, California
Fairs in California
Festivals in California
Food and drink festivals in the United States
1921 establishments in California
Festivals established in 1921
Fruit festivals